Steagall Glacier is a tributary glacier, 15 nautical miles (28 km) long, draining the east slopes of Rawson Plateau between Mount Alice Gade and Mount Deardorff and flowing north to enter Bowman Glacier, in the Queen Maud Mountains. First mapped by the Byrd Antarctic Expedition, 1928–30. Named by Advisory Committee on Antarctic Names (US-ACAN) for Jack Steagall, meteorologist, South Pole Station winter party, 1961.

Glaciers of Amundsen Coast